The Embassy of Turkmenistan in Moscow is the diplomatic mission of Turkmenistan to the Russian Federation. It is located at Moscow, Filippovskiy lane 22. The current Ambassador is Batyr Niyazliyev.

The building was constructed in 1908 as an apartment house (architect Georgy Evlanov) and was later rebuilt.

History 

Diplomatic relations between Turkmenistan and the Russian Federation were established on April 8, 1992.

Ambassadors 
 Khalnazar Agakhanov (1999-2012)
 Berdymurad Rejepov (2012-2016)
 Batyr Niyazliev (since 2016)

Outside Moscow 
In 2013, Turkmenistan opened a consulate in Astrakhan.

The Consulate General of Turkmenistan in Kazan was opened in 2020.

See also
Russia–Turkmenistan relations
Diplomatic missions in Russia
Diplomatic missions of Turkmenistan
Embassy of Russia in Turkmenistan

References

External links

Official website

Turkmenistan
Moscow
Russia–Turkmenistan relations
Cultural heritage monuments in Moscow